No. 26 Squadron RNZAF was a squadron of the Royal New Zealand Air Force. Formed in October 1943, during World War II, from "C Flight", No. 25 Squadron at RNZAF Station Seagrove to be equipped with Douglas SBD Dauntless dive bombers, however was disbanded in January 1944. Reformed in March 1945 at RNZAF Station Ardmore, equipped with Chance-Vought F4U-1 Corsair fighter bombers. The squadron was based at Kukum Field on Guadalcanal and Piva Airfield on Bougainville before being disbanded in June 1945.

Commanding Officer
Squadron Leader G. A. Delves

Citations

References
Owen, R.E. Official History of New Zealand in the Second World War 1939–45, Government Printer, Wellington, New Zealand 1955

26
Military units and formations established in 1943
Military units and formations disestablished in 1945
Squadrons of the RNZAF in World War II